Lie Detectors is an American television series broadcast by Game Show Network. The series, hosted by Rove McManus, premiered on April 20, 2015.

Each episode features a panel of three comedians presenting a variety of random facts and lies over several rounds to a studio audience, who vote to decide which of the three comedians tells the truth in each round.

Production
The series received little advanced attention from GSN before it was announced as green-lit on March 10, 2015. During the first week of the series' run, a new episode aired each weekday (Monday to Friday) at 6:30 p.m. ET. Starting on April 29 of the same year, the show moved to its permanent time slot, with two back-to-back new episodes airing each Wednesday at 9:00 p.m. ET. The series was not renewed for a second season.

Cast
Panelists on the show have included:
 Christian Finnegan
 Michelle Buteau
 Sherrod Small
 Liza Treyger
 Dave Hill
 Gina Brillon
 Nick Turner
 Rachel Feinstein
 Casey Jost
 Sean Donnelly
 Sabrina Jalees
 Jennifer Bartels
 Lil Rel Howery
 Arden Myrin
 Brandon Scott Jones
 Jade Catta-Preta

Reception
Both David Knox and Neil Genzlinger, writing for Australia's TV Tonight and The New York Times respectively, drew comparisons between the series and To Tell the Truth.

Ratings
The first episode in its regular timeslot on April 29, 2015 rated 342,000 American viewers, losing 191,000 viewers from lead-in Idiotest. On May 6, 2015, it dropped to 298,000 viewers.

References

External links
  at the Wayback Machine
 

2010s American comedy game shows
2015 American television series debuts
2015 American television series endings
English-language television shows
Game Show Network original programming